Costa Rica first participated at the Olympic Games in 1936, but then missed the next four Olympiads.  The nation returned to the Games in 1964, and has participated in every Summer Olympic Games since then.  Costa Rica has also participated in several Winter Olympic Games since 1980.

Costa Rican athletes have won a total of four medals, all by Silvia Poll and Claudia Poll in swimming.

The National Olympic Committee for Costa Rica was created in 1936 and recognized by the International Olympic Committee in the same year. The N.O.C. was named Comité Olímpico de Costa Rica.

Medal tables

Medals by Summer Games

Medals by Winter Games

Medals by sport

List of medalists

See also

 :Category:Olympic competitors for Costa Rica
 List of flag bearers for Costa Rica at the Olympics
 Costa Rica at the Paralympics
 Tropical nations at the Winter Olympics

External links
 
 
 

 
Olympics